Stage's Pond State Nature Preserve is a  nature preserve with ponds in Walnut Township, Pickaway County, Ohio.

The State Nature Preserve is located at 4792 Hagerty Road, north of the county seat of Circleville. The preserve was dedicated on August 23, 1974.

Natural history
The large pond is an example of a kettle lake, one created by a melted piece of ice broken off from a glacier.

The ponds and surrounding habitat are a resting point for large numbers of migratory birds.

Gallery

External links 
 Official Stage's Pond State Nature Preserve website
 U.S. Geological Survey Map at the U.S. Geological Survey Map Website. Retrieved November 6, 2022.

Ohio State Nature Preserves
Lakes of Ohio
Protected areas of Pickaway County, Ohio
Bodies of water of Pickaway County, Ohio
Protected areas established in 1974
1974 establishments in Ohio